Mucronella flava is a species of fungus in the family Clavariaceae. It was originally described by English mycologist E.J.H. Corner in 1953.

References

External links

Clavariaceae
Fungi described in 1953
Taxa named by E. J. H. Corner